Kaintiba Rural LLG is a local-level government (LLG) of Gulf Province, Papua New Guinea.

Wards
01. Bema
02. Mine
03. Wimka
04. Wempango
05. Kaingo
06. Hambia
07. Yemepango
08. Hawabango
09. Karangea
10. Kwoi'amunga
11. Kengo
12. Hapataewa
13. Kaintiba Station
14. Ikose
15. Yakitangwa

References

Local-level governments of Gulf Province